Indie sleaze was a fashion aesthetic popular in the United States and United Kingdom from approximately 2006 to 2012. Often called equivalent to the hipster, indie sleaze has been described by some as an optimistic response to the Great Recession. It was defined by affordable clothing, amateur flash photography, and hedonism, among other things.

It experienced a resurgence in the early 2020s, when the style was first named and became popular on social media platforms such as Instagram and TikTok.

Style
Described by Daniel Rodgers of Dazed as "grubby, maximalist, and performatively vintage", indie sleaze was inspired both by 1980s fashion and grunge fashion. Indie sleaze has been called equivalent to the hipster aesthetic. Vices Arielle Richards described indie sleaze as a combination of other trends and styles, such as twee, scene, and electropop; NMEs El Hunt wrote that indie sleaze was defined by a sense of "chaotic spontaneity". 

Clothes including metallic bodysuits, studded "Lita" boots manufactured by shoe company Jeffrey Campbell, lamé leggings, chokers, shutter shades, ballet flats, Keffiyeh, chunky gold jewelry, striped shirts, lensless glasses, sheer tops, big belts, plaid pants, cardigans, A-line skirts, tennis skirts, high-top Converse sneakers, long or layered necklaces, cropped leather jackets, fedoras, the Balenciaga Motorcycle Bag, stockings with shorts, wired headphones, band T-shirts, and skinny jeans, as well as other elements such as galaxy prints, "Aztec" prints, side-swept bangs, "waif-thin" bodies, "recession roots", smudged eyeliner and mascara, amateur flash photography, torn clothing, Polaroid cameras, cigarettes, and drug use have all been listed as hallmarks of indie sleaze. American Apparel was influential on the development of indie sleaze.

Music
Musical acts like Sky Ferreira, the Libertines, Digitalism, Arctic Monkeys, Hot Chip, Ariel Pink's Haunted Graffiti, Cut Copy, Pnau, Justice, Klaxons, Late of the Pier, MGMT, Yeah Yeah Yeahs, The Rapture, Peaches, LCD Soundsystem, Crystal Castles, Paolo Nutini, Franz Ferdinand, The Walkmen, Razorlight, The Kooks, The Noisettes, The Faint, Kings of Leon, and The Strokes, and genres like electroclash and post-punk revival are considered key musical aspects of the indie sleaze era. Indie Sleaze was also largely inspired by music produced and developed in Australia, such as Bang Gang Deejays, Muscles and Mercy Arms, and through large-scale music festivals with headline acts, such as Parklife.

History
The term "indie sleaze" was coined in 2021, the same year that the style became popular again through TikTok, by an Instagram account dedicated to the aesthetic, @indiesleaze, launched by a woman named Olivia V. The term was inspired by indie music, the 2000s magazine Sleaze, and the Uffie lyric "I'll make your sleazy dreams come true." Indie sleaze's popularity coincided with the rise and peak of MySpace and the early days of Tumblr, from about 2006 to 2012. Samantha Maxwell of Paste wrote that indie sleaze "feels like a reaction to the early years of Obama's presidency: The economy may have crashed, but there was still a sense of sparkling optimism in the air." Olivia V similarly stated that indie sleaze began before the Great Recession, allowing for a sense of optimism. Welsh singer Gwenno stated that the indie sleaze period was "very debauched, and probably the last moment where kids had been able to do whatever they want." 

Various celebrities and public figures, including singers Pete Doherty, M.I.A., Sky Ferreira, and Beth Ditto; photographers The Cobrasnake and Terry Richardson, blogger Alexa Chung; actresses Mary-Kate and Ashley Olsen; designers Henry Holland and Jeremy Scott; and models Cory Kennedy, Agyness Deyn, Pixie Geldof have been called progenitors of indie sleaze. L'Officiel USA named the character Effy Stonem from the British television series Skins "the perfect representative for [indie sleaze]."

Searches on Google for "indie sleaze" spiked in early 2022. The resurgence of indie sleaze in the early 2020s has been attributed to its affordability, its carefree nature, and post-pandemic partying.

Criticism
Arielle Richards of Vice criticized the alleged resurgence of indie sleaze as fake, writing that it was "created by a bunch of overworked millennials trawling Instagram, TikTok, and Google, in a bid to provide the winning take on something that isn't really happening." Stylists Naomi May similarly wrote in 2022 that indie sleaze as a trend was a "myth", pointing to the retirement of key figures of indie sleaze, such as Deyn, Holland, Chung, and Doherty, and the body positivity movement as evidence. Daniel Dylan Wray of The Quietus wrote that indie sleaze itself was "contrived into existence as a genre/label" despite having "never existed to begin with", adding, "With indie sleaze, there appears to be little else going on other than some people wallowing in the past while trying to convince themselves that it, or maybe even them, possesses some sort of contemporary relevance."

See also
Scene kids
Hipster subculture

References

2000s fashion
2010s fashion
2000s fads and trends
2010s fads and trends
2020s fashion
2020s fads and trends